The FA Amateur Cup 1973–74 was the 71st and last staging of England's principal cup tournament for amateur teams, the FA Amateur Cup. Bishop's Stortford won the competition for the first time, beating Ilford 4–1 in the final at Wembley.

Matches were scheduled to be played at the stadium of the team named first on the date specified for each round, which was always a Saturday. Some matches, however, might be rescheduled for other days if there were clashes with games for other competitions or the weather was inclement. If scores were level after 90 minutes had been played, a replay would take place at the stadium of the second-named team later the same week. If the replayed match was drawn further replays would be held until a winner was determined. If scores were level after 90 minutes had been played in a replay, a 30-minute period of extra time would be played.

Calendar

First round proper

The matches were scheduled to be played on Saturday, 5 January 1974, with four ties postponed to the next Saturday. For the first time in the competition's history, matches could be played on Sunday, and three clubs applied for a permission. There were seven replayed ties, of which one needed a second replay and another a third.

Second round proper

The matches were scheduled to be played on Saturday, 26 January 1974, but one tie was postponed to the next Saturday, and one was played on Sunday. Five replays were necessary (one of which was played on Sunday).

Third round proper

The matches were scheduled to be played on Saturday, 9 February 1974, but four ties were postponed to the next Saturday (including one due to delay in settling a second round tie. Four replays were necessary, as well as one second replay.

Fourth round proper

The matches were scheduled to be played on Saturday, 2 March 1974, with one tie postponed to the following Saturday, and one replay necessary.

Semi-finals

The matches were scheduled to be played on Saturday, 23 March 1974, on neutral venues. There was one replay.

Final

1948-49
Amateur Cup